Ernst Hinterseer (born 27 February 1932) is a retired alpine skier from Austria. He participated in the 1956 Winter Olympics in Cortina d'Ampezzo, placing sixth in the giant slalom. At the 1960 Winter Olympics he won a gold medal in the slalom, and bronze in the giant slalom. He was only a substitute for the slalom, and was trailing in fifth place after the first leg.

Hinterseer won two national titles: in the giant slalom in 1954 and in a combined event in 1956. He became an "Austrian sportsman of the Year 1960" and in 1997 was awarded the "Goldenes Ehrenzeichen für Verdienste um die Republik Österreich" ("Order in gold of merit for services rendered to the Republic of Austria"). 

Hinterseer was born in a farmer's family. After World War II he started an apprenticeship as a carpenter, but focused on skiing after graduating from school. After the 1960 Olympics he turned professional and won the 1963 world title. He retired in 1967 to become a coach, and in 1974–76 headed the Austrian Ski Federation. His sons Ernst, Georg, and Hansi also became ski racers, while his grandson Lukas Hinterseer played football for the Austria national football team.

See also
 Bee Hive Ski Races, Hinterseer was a winner in 1963 and 1964

References

External links

 Ernst Hinterseer at the Kitzbühel Ski Club
 

 The Fourth Annual Bee Hive Giant Slalom, 1964, Archives of Ontario YouTube Channel

1932 births
Living people
Austrian male alpine skiers
Olympic alpine skiers of Austria
Alpine skiers at the 1956 Winter Olympics
Alpine skiers at the 1960 Winter Olympics
Olympic gold medalists for Austria
Olympic bronze medalists for Austria
Sportspeople from Tyrol (state)
Olympic medalists in alpine skiing
Medalists at the 1960 Winter Olympics